Robin Buchanan is a Director of companies and an adviser to family offices, private equity firms, businesses and voluntary organisations.

Buchanan is a non-executive director of Schroders, the FTSE 100 global asset management company[1], where he contributes as a member of the Chairman’s, Remuneration, Nomination, Audit & Risk Committees. He also serves as a non-executive director at LyondellBasell, the Fortune 500 petrochemical and refinery company, where he serves on both the Compensation and Nomination & Governance Committees. He chairs the Investment Committee of Access Industries, a family holding company. Buchanan is also a Senior Adviser to Bain & Company and to Coller Capital. In addition, he is a trustee of Trees for Life, the conservation charity dedicated to restoring the Caledonian Forest.

Buchanan previously served as Chairman of Michael Page International, a recruitment company, from 2011 to 2015. He is also the former Dean and President of London Business School.[2][3] Under his leadership the School was ranked number one in the world for both its MBA and Executive MBA programmes.

Before joining London Business School in 2007, he spent 25 years at Bain & Company. He joined Bain in 1982, becoming partner in 1986.[2] He was elected the Managing Partner of Bain in the UK in 1990 and appointed the Senior Partner for the UK and South Africa in 1996. He was a member of the management buyout team led by Mitt Romney that acquired Bain in 1991. From 1990 to 2007, the UK business grew at over 25% per annum. He also served as a member of the Management Committee, Compensation Committee and chaired the Nominating Committee of the worldwide Board of Directors. He headed both the worldwide Acquisitions & Alliances practice and the UK Organisational Enhancement and Change Management practice.

From 1979 to 1982 Buchanan worked for American Express International Banking Corporation,[4] now part of Standard Chartered. Prior to that, he was employed by Mann Judd Landau[2] (now Deloitte & Touche) and McKinsey & Company.

Buchanan was a director of Liberty International,[1] a property company, where he chaired the Remuneration Committee and contributed to the Audit, Nominations and Chairman’s Committees. He was also a director of Shire,[1] a pharmaceutical company, where he served on its Remuneration Committee.

He is a published author on strategy, acquisitions, customer loyalty, leadership, board effectiveness and corporate governance, remuneration, family companies and private equity (see articles).

Buchanan was awarded an MBA with High Distinction from Harvard Business School, where he was a Baker Scholar[4] and member of the Harvard Business School Rugby Club. He is a Fellow of the Institute of Chartered Accountants of England & Wales.[4] and Financial Services Authority "Approved Person".

References

External links

Year of birth missing (living people)
Living people
Business educators
People associated with London Business School
Harvard Business School alumni
Schroders people